Eupithecia jamesi is a moth in the family Geometridae first described by Clifford D. Ferris and Vladimir G. Mironov in 2007.

Moths of this family are found in the desert regions of the south-western United States, including Arizona, Nevada and California.

The wingspan is about 22–23 mm. Adults have been recorded on wing from January to March.

References 

jamesi
Moths described in 2007
Moths of North America